Baç Bridge ( also called Justinyen Köprüsü) is a bridge in Tarsus in Mersin Province, Turkey

Geography
It is over the Berdan River (Latin:Cydnus), and on the former highway connecting Tarsus to Adana.

History
During the ancient ages the course of Berdan River was at the west of the city which was then a Mediterranean Sea port. But because of alluvial deposits from the Berdan River the coastline was continuously moving to south. By the 6th century, the coastline had already been moved away and a small lagoon named Rhegma had been formed which obstructed the river flow in the rainy seasons and caused floods. Byzantine Emperor Justinian I (reigned 527-565) changed the course of the river by constructing a channel at the east of the city to facilitate easier flow. The channel is the present course of the river.  Justinian also constructed the bridge bearing his name over the new course.
 
During the early Turkish (pre Ottoman ) times the caravans  had to pay a certain customs duty to use the bridge. The word for customs duty was “baç” (sometimes spelled bac) and the bridge was renamed “baç bridge”. According to an essay by a local historian the baç was cancelled during the Ottoman era

In 1960s a ring road connecting Mersin to Adana was constructed to the south of Tarsus and Baç Bridge was put out of use. After its active service life now the bridge is conserved in the Kuvai Milliye Park of Tarsus 
It was restored in 1978.

Construction
The bridge is an arch bridge. There are three arches.

References

Tarsus, Mersin
Arch bridges in Turkey
Bridges completed in the 6th century
Roman bridges in Turkey
Buildings of Justinian I
Buildings and structures in Mersin Province
Stone arch bridges
Former toll bridges in Turkey